The Noyes Museum of Art is an art museum.  It styles itself as the only fine arts museum in southern New Jersey.  The museum opened in 1983 in Galloway Township, New Jersey.  Due to lack of funds for needed repairs, the main Galloway building in Oceanville was closed to the public in 2016.  The Oceanville property was eventually sold in 2021.  The museum has since moved into four other affiliated sites where its collection is displayed: the Noyes Art Garage in Atlantic City, Kramer Hall in Hammonton, the Noyes Gallery at The Claridge Hotel in Atlantic City, and the Seaview golf club in Galloway.

Since 2017, the museum is fully a part of Stockton University, a partnership which began in 2010 and expanded in 2016.

History

The Noyes Museum of Art was created largely due to the philanthropic efforts of Fred and Ethel Noyes.  Fred Noyes helped create and promote the "Historic Towne of Smithville" tourist and activity site, and was the owner of the Smithville Inn restaurant.  Noyes was also an avid art collector, and used his own personal collection to start the museum's collection.  The Noyes family created their foundation in 1973 and began design of the museum in 1974, using funds from the sale of Historic Smithville.  The museum eventually opened in 1983 at its Oceanville, Galloway site on Lily Lake, only 2 miles (3 km) away from Smithville.  The museum was built directly next to the Edwin B. Forsythe National Wildlife Refuge.

The Noyes Museum served as a cultural center within Atlantic County; in addition to its art collection, it also hosted concerts, educational classes, and events.  It was known in the area for being in a somewhat unique place for an art museum, nestled within a secluded forested area and surrounded by wildlife.  Ethel Noyes died in 1979, during the museum's construction, and Fred Noyes died in 1987, but the charitable foundation they built continued on.

The museum began to run into budgetary problems from its heating and air conditioning (HVAC) systems, which became increasingly inefficient with time.  Additionally, its electrical systems needed to be upgraded, and the building was not entirely compliant with the ADA (Americans with Disabilities Act, which was passed after the building was created).  The museum signed an agreement with the Richard Stockton College of New Jersey (formerly Stockton State College, now Stockton University) in 2010 in which Stockton would gain access to some of the Noyes collection, and the college would agree to invest $500,000 to upgrade the building and bring it into compliance with modern building codes.  The university backed out of this agreement in late 2015, though, and both it and the Noyes Foundation decided it was not worth spending more money into the structure.  Executive Director Michael Cagno called it "a beautiful location but it was in the middle of nowhere" and that the business case for repairing the structure was not good.  As a result, in January 2016, the original Noyes Museum building was closed.

In August 2017, Stockton University took over control of the Noyes Foundation's holdings.  In December 2017, Stockton University took control over the final remaining assets of the Noyes Foundation, including ownership of the Oceanville property.  The foundation's donated assets were estimated to be worth 2.2 million dollars.

Current status
The main Galloway location was put up for sale after its closure.  In 2021, the original Oceanville property was sold to a local church.  The Noyes Museum still exists, however, and its collection currently rotates between three sites where it is displayed: the Seaview golf club in Galloway (albeit a different location within Galloway Township than the original), the Arts Garage in Atlantic City, the Noyes Gallery at The Claridge Hotel in Atlantic City, and at Stockton's Kramer Hall in Hammonton.  The largest of the sites is the Noyes Arts Garage, which opened in 2013 as a new spinoff venture of the Noyes Foundation.  It is located in downtown Atlantic City near the edge of the Tanger Outlets The Walk outdoor mall.  The building was redeveloped by Atlantic City's Casino Reinvestment Development Authority (CRDA) which leases the site to Noyes at no cost.  The Arts Garage includes space for independent artists to set up shop and sell their own wares, although the mall section has had trouble attracting enough foot traffic to keep the stores solvent.  Kramer Hall in Hammonton is the second largest, and is used for storing much of the collection.

The Noyes collection includes 3,500 pieces of art and sculpture.  It includes a set of over 300 duck decoys, a personal interest of Fred Noyes that he began collecting at a young age; the decoys are now in Hammonton's Town Hall.

Gallery

References

External links
 
 The Noyes Arts Garage at Atlantic City

Art museums and galleries in New Jersey
Museums in Atlantic County, New Jersey
Galloway Township, New Jersey
Stockton University
1983 establishments in New Jersey
Art museums established in 1983